Tubas (Tûbâs) is a Palestinian city in the northeastern West Bank, located northeast of Nablus, west of the Jordan Valley. A city of over 63,000 inhabitants, it serves as the economic and administrative center of the Tubas Governorate of the State of Palestine. Its urban area consists of 2,271 dunams (227 hectares). It is governed by a municipal council of 15 members and most of its working inhabitants are employed in agriculture or public services.

Tubas has been identified as the ancient town of Thebez, a Canaanite town famous for revolting against King Abimelech. During the late 19th century, during Ottoman rule in Palestine, Arab clans living in the Jordan Valley  came to live in Tubas, and it became a major town in the District of Nablus, particularly known for its timber and cheese-making. It came under the British Mandate of Palestine in 1922, was annexed by Jordan after their capture of the town in the 1948 Arab–Israeli War, and then occupied by Israel since the 1967 Six-Day War. The Palestinian National Authority has had control of Tubas since the city was transferred to its jurisdiction in 1995.

History

Ancient era
Edward Robinson thought Tubas to be identical with the Canaanite/Israelite town of "Thebez" mentioned in the Hebrew Bible in the Book of Judges. It is the namesake of the titular woman of Thebez.

Archaeological remains such as cemeteries and olive presses indicate that Tubas was inhabited during the Roman era of rule in Palestine. Jerome mentioned Thebez being 13 Roman miles east of Neapolis (Nablus). Besides the Biblical story, nothing has been known about Thebez before or after the revolt.

Ottoman era
In 1596 it appeared in the Ottoman tax registers as "Tubas", in the nahiya of Jabal Sami in the liwa of Nablus. It had a population of 41 households and 16 bachelors, all Muslim. The villagers paid a fixed tax rate of 33.3% on wheat, barley, summer crops, olive trees, occasional revenues, goats, beehives, and a press for olives or grapes; a total of 11,704 akçe

In the late 19th century during Ottoman rule in Palestine, groups of Arabs belonging to the Daraghmeh clan—mostly shepherds and farmers who lived in the Jordan Valley—migrated northward to the site because of its fertile ground, proximity to several springs, and its high elevation compared to the Jordan Valley and Wadi al-Far'a plain; Mount Gerizim was visible from the area. The Daraghmeh clan had lived in the Jordan Valley since the 15th century and in addition to Tubas, they founded or inhabited the nearby hamlets of Kardala, al-Farisiya, Khirbet al-Malih, Kishda, Yarza, and Ras al-Far'a. Soon after being established in Tubas, Arabs from Najd, Syria, Transjordan, Hebron and nearby Nablus came to settle in the area. During this period, Tubas became the site of clashes between the 'Abd al-Hadi and Tuqan families of Nablus and suffered incursions by Bedouins from areas east of the city. The Jarrar family did not inhabit, but administrated Tubas, as it was located within the nahiya ("subdistrict") of Mashariq al-Jarrar.

Tubas was one of the largest villages in the District of Nablus. Most of the inhabitants resided in mud-built houses or tents in order to work on their distant lands in the Jordan Valley and to graze their sheep and goat flocks. According to traveler Herbert Rix, compared to other towns of its size in Samaria, Tubas was "well-to-do" and had abundant amounts of timber which was harvested for firewood. Tubas, unlike the villages in the rest of the district, depended on livestock and not olives for income. Livestock products included cheese, clarified butter, woolen rugs, tents, ropes, and cloth bags. In 1882 a boys' school was established in the town.

In 1877 Lieutenant Kitchener, of the Palestine Exploration Fund survey team, reported uncovering an Arabic inscription buried in the wall of the village mosque recording its building and dedication. He also wrote that the villagers had paid a bribe of £100 in gold to the Pasha of Nablus to avoid their young men being conscripted into the Turkish army fighting in Crimea. He noted that they would probably have to repeat the payment.

The Palestine Exploration Fund noted that the Samaritans believed that the tomb of Asher, known locally as Nabi Tota ("the good prophet"), was located in Tubas. The tomb served as a shrine in local Muslim tradition.

British Mandate era
In 1917, the British captured Palestine from the Ottomans. After rule under a military government, it was reorganized in 1922–23 Tubas was incorporated into the British Mandate of Palestine.

In the 1922 census of Palestine Tubas had a population of 3,449; 3,441 Muslims and 7 Orthodox Christians. In the 1931 census,  Tubas, (including Kashda and Jabagia) had 773 occupied houses and a population of 4,097, mostly Muslims, but also including 29 Christians.

In Sami Hadawi's 1945 statistics land and population survey, Tubas and nearby Bardala had a combined population of 5,530; 5,470 Muslims and 60 Christians, with 313,123 dunams of land, according to an official land and population survey. Of this, 18,498 dunams were used for plantations and irrigable land, 98,518 dunams for cereals, while 204 dunams were built-up (urban) land.

In 1947, the United Nations drew up a partition plan to divide Palestine into Jewish and Arab states; Tubas and the surrounding villages and hamlets were to be included in the Arab state. During the 1948 Arab–Israeli War, Fawzi al-Qawuqji led 750 Arab Liberation Army (ALA) soldiers to Tubas from Transjordan and set up base there; Tubas would serve as the ALA's headquarters in central Palestine throughout the war.

Jordanian era
In the wake of the 1948 Arab–Israeli War, and after the 1949 Armistice Agreements, Tubas came under Jordanian rule.

In 1955 the first girls' school was opened.

In 1961, the population was 5,709,  while in 1964, Tubas alone had a population of 5,880.

Post-1967

Since the Six-Day War in 1967, Tubas has been under Israeli occupation.

Tubas was transferred to Palestinian National Authority (PNA) control in 1995 under the Interim Agreement on the West Bank and the Gaza Strip. During the Jordanian and Israeli periods, the city was under the administration of the Nablus Governorate, but in 1996, the PNA declared Tubas and the immediate area to be an electoral district, and later, an independent administrative area—the Tubas Governorate.

Tubas has not seen as much violence in the Israeli–Palestinian conflict as nearby Nablus and Jenin, but a number of incidents occurred during the Second Intifada, which began in 2000. In April 2002, the Israeli forces (IDF) killed six active Hamas members in the town, including Ashraf Tamza Daraghmeh—the chief Hamas commander in Tubas and the surrounding area. On August 31, 2002, an Israeli Apache helicopter fired four Hellfire missiles at a civilian car suspected of carrying a local al-Aqsa Martyrs Brigades commander and a nearby home. The strike instead killed five civilians, including two children, two teenagers and a 29-year-old Fatah activist accused of being a member of the al-Aqsa Brigades. The Israeli Defense Minister, Binyamin Ben-Eliezer, issued a statement expressing "regret" over "harming" civilians in Tubas. Ben-Eliezer described the raid in Tubas as a "mistake", and promised that the army would investigate the incident. On August 21, 2009, a clash between the Sawafta clan and another city clan left a member of the former dead and 38 others injured. Five homes were also burnt and Palestinian Security Forces arrested five people in connection to the death.

Geography

In a 1945 land survey, Tubas along with nearby Bardala and Kardala consisted of 313,123 dunams (31,312 hectares) of which 220,594 was Arab-owned and the remainder being public property. , its total land area consists of 295,123 dunams (29,512 hectares), of which 2,271 is classified as built-up, roughly 150,000 used for agricultural purposes and about 180,000 has been expropriated by Israel for military bases and buffer zone.

Tubas is located to the northeast of Nablus, and west of the Jordan Valley. Nearby localities include the town of Aqqaba to the north, Tayasir and Aqabah villages to the northeast, Ras al-Far'a to the southwest, the Palestinian refugee camp of Far'a to the south and the al-Bikai'a village cluster to the southeast.

It has a moderate climate; the summer is hot and dry, and the winter is cold and wet.

Demographics

About 1,100 residents fled Tubas after the 1967 Six-Day War mostly to the Souf refugee camp in Jordan, while 260 immigrated there and in 1981 its population was 5,300.

In the Palestinian Central Bureau of Statistics' (PCBS) first official census in 1997, Tubas had a population of 11,760 inhabitants. The gender make-up was 50.8% male and 49.2% female. Tubas has an overwhelmingly young population with 52.7% of the city's residents below the age of 20. People between the ages of 20 and 34 constitute 24.7%, 17.7% between the ages of 35 and 64, while people above the age of 64 constituted 4.9% of the population. The census also revealed that refugees made up 6.1% of the total residents.

In the 2007 census by the PCBS, Tubas had a population of 16,154, increasing around 33% from 1997. The city represents roughly a third (33.4%) of the Tubas Governorate's total population. The city's modern-era founders, the Daraghmeh clan, constitute 70% of Tubas' inhabitants. The clan has several smaller branches, including the Mslamany, Abd al-Razeq and Abu Khazaran families. The Sawafta family make up 25%, the Husheh make up 3% and the Fuquha represent the remaining 2%. The inhabitants of Tubas are predominantly Muslims, but there is a community of approximately 60 Palestinian Christians, all belonging to the Greek Orthodox Church. The Christian community worships at the Holy Trinity Church in the city and is serviced by a priest from nearby Zababdeh.

According to the 2017 census by the PCBS, the population of Tubas was 60,186,  forming 1.3% of the total population of Palestine.

Economy
The economical situation Tubas during the 1993–99 period was prosperous, however since the start of the Second Intifada in 2000–01, Tubas' income level has decreased by roughly 40%. Prior to the Intifada, the average household income was 2,500 NIS; it has since receded to about 1,500 NIS. A major factor that has resulted from the conflict was the confiscation of agricultural land located within the city's or its governorate's jurisdiction by Israeli settlements or military authorities. According to the PCBS, in 1999, approximately 52% of the citizens were within the working age (15-64). Of the city's labor force, 48% are females. The unemployment rate increased dramatically from 20% in 1999 to 70% after the year 2000. Prior to the Intifada, 35% of the total labor force worked in Israel.

Currently, agriculture constitutes 60% of Tubas' economic activity, public services comprise 17%, trade is 10%, Israeli labor is 8%, construction and industry make-up the remaining 5%. In the city, there are 240 shops and stores, 70 service institutions and one big ready mix concrete factory 30 small ones.

The main economic sector in Tubas is agriculture. There is a total of 150,000 dunams of arable land, of which 124,450 dunams are covered by forests and 10,604 dunams cultivated. Although the land is fertile, there is a lack of water for irrigation. The only spring used is in nearby Ein Far'a. Field crops account for 49% of the cultivable land, while fruit orchards account for 40% and vegetables make-up 11%. Israeli trenches around the neighboring villages of Ras al-Ahmar and Khirbet al-'Atuf prevent access to nearly 40% of Tubas' arable lands.

Many Tubas residents keep livestock, mostly sheep; in 2005, there was a total 6,670 sheep. Other livestock owned include 96 heads of cattle, 880 goats and 126,500 poultry. In addition, 123 beehives were kept. In 2006 the Golden Sheep Dairy factory was founded in Tubas with help from UCODEP, an Italian NGO. The factory specializes in the production of Italian cheese and primarily targets cosmopolitan consumers in Ramallah, Bethlehem and Jerusalem as well as international workers and diplomats living in the West Bank.

Government
Tubas serves as the muhfaza ("capital" or "seat") of the Tubas Governorate. Since 1995, Tubas has been located in Area A, giving the PNA full control over its security, administration and civilian affairs.

Tubas has been governed by a municipal council since 1953, when it was granted permission to do so by Jordanian authorities who controlled the West Bank at the time. The council is made up of 15 members including the mayor, and is headquartered in the municipal hall in the center of the town. The municipality has over 60 employees. Responsibilities of the municipality include civil administration, urban planning and development, social development services, distribution of social services, the issuing of building permits and infrastructural maintenance: water, electricity and solid waste collection.

Auqab Daraghmeh was succeeded by Jamal Abdel Fattah Mahmoud Abu Mohsin, an independent candidate, elected in the 2005 Palestinian municipal elections. During the elections, women won two seats, and though Tubas is normally a Fatah stronghold, all seats were won by independent political lists.

Education
In 2004–05, Tubas had twelve schools; four for males, three for females and five co-educational. There were 4,924 students and 191 teachers. In addition, six kindergartens are located in the city, and have a total of 620 pupils. In 1997, the literacy rate was 86%; females comprised 78.3% of the illiterate population. Of the literate population, 25.7% completed elementary education, 23.3% completed preparatory education and 22.1% completed secondary or higher education. Many students throughout the Jordan Valley receive their education in Tubas. The Al-Quds Open University, based in Jerusalem, has a campus in Tubas known as Al-Quds Open University-Tubas Educational Region. In 2006, 1,789 students were enrolled in the university, it had 90 professors and 24 other employees.

Local infrastructure
Tubas contains six mosques. The main mosques are the Abd ar-Rahan Mosque, the al-Tawled Mosque, Umar ibn al-Khattab Mosque, and Shaheed Mosque. The Holy Trinity Orthodox Church is also located in Tubas, in the northern part of the city. The church was built in 1976 to serve the small Orthodox Christian community. It consists of a prayer room, a fellowship hall, an office, and a library for children.

Since Tubas is the capital and largest city in the Tubas Governorate, it acts as the main provider of services to the towns and villages of the governorate. All Palestinian National Authority offices that serve the governorate are located in the city. There are 21 government institutions in Tubas, including a post office, the Palestinian Ministry of Labor office, the Palestinian Ministry of Agriculture office, the Palestinian Ministry of Social Affairs office, the fire department and a police station.

Transportation
Buses and taxis are the primary means of transportation in Tubas. Tubas is located on Highway 588 connected to the main Ramallah-Nablus road (Highway 60) by a network of northeastern offshoots of the road, that pass through the villages of Azmut, al-Badhan and Ras al-Far'a. It is connected to Jenin from a northern road which passes through 'Aqqaba, Zababdeh and finally to Jenin. Travel to Jordan is through Highway 57 which is connected with Highway 588 just to the south of Tubas.

Health care
The city contains five health centers run by various organizations including the Palestinian Red Crescent. There are no hospitals in Tubas, nor in the Tubas Governorate; Residents must travel to Nablus for hospital treatment, but there are two ambulances in Tubas for emergency transportation. There are four clinics in the city: Two are run by non-governmental organizations, one by the Palestinian National Authority and one is privately owned. The clinics lack modern equipment and specialists, however. In addition, ten pharmacies exist in Tubas.

Utilities
Approximately 60% of the residents have a telephone connection, and roughly 90% are connected to the water. The Tubas Municipality administers all water resources in and around the city. In addition to the water network, there is one spring (Far'a) in the immediate area which is the main provider of water for use in households. This is primarily used to provide water to the urban areas of the city during Summer, and is only available once on a weekly basis.

From 1963 to 1997 local municipal-owned electric generators provided Tubas with all of its electricity needs. In 1997, the city connected with the Tubas Area Electricity Network which is provided by the Israeli Electric Cooperation. In that period, 99% of households in the city were connected with electricity. Solid waste management in Tubas is operated by the municipality and Joint Services Council. It is collected 3-4 times daily from the residential area, which is sent to a shared dumping site  from the city. The main disposal method used is burning. Tubas is not connected to the sewage network, therefore all households dispose of their waste water in cesspits, a major source of pollution in groundwater.

See also
 List of cities administered by the Palestinian National Authority

References

Bibliography

External links
Welcome To The City of Tubas
Tubas City, Welcome to Palestine
Tubas City (Fact Sheet), Applied Research Institute–Jerusalem, ARIJ
Tubas City profile, ARIJ
Survey of Western Palestine, Map 12:   IAA, Wikimedia commons
Tubas Bio Data - United Nations (pdf file)

Tubas Governorate
Cities in the West Bank
Municipalities of the State of Palestine